Ram Leela is a 2015 Indian Telugu-language romantic comedy film directed by Sripuram Kiran, featuring Havish, Abijeet, and Nanditha in the lead roles. The film received poor reviews and failed to perform at the box office.

Cast 
Havish as Ram
Abijeet as Krish
Nanditha as Sasya
Bhanu Chander 
Saptagiri
Ali  
Anitha 
Krishnudu
Viva Harsha
Nagineedu as Sasya's father (Cameo appearance)
Madalsa Sharma as an item number

Plot 
Krish(Abhijith) is a software professional in the US. One fine day, he comes across Sasya(Nanditha) on TV and falls in love with her. Abhijit comes back to India and somehow convinces Sasya to marry him. The couple head to Malaysia for their honeymoon. Twist in the tale arises when Sasya leaves Krish and decides to meet her ex-boyfriend. Rest of the story is as to how Abhijit manages to win his wife back and where does Ram(Havish) future in all this set up.

Production 
The film began production in November 2014 and ended in December of the same year. The film was shot for 38 days in Malaysia and India.

Soundtrack 
Songs composed by Chinna.
"Yemaindho Yegere" - Deepak, Shravya
"Nuvvuleni"- Deepak
"Bhajana BHajana" - Simha
"Puvvulona Nuvve" - Malavika, Monisha, Ranjith
"Manasuloni Maata" - Deepak
Music Bit - Malavika, Rakesh, Sivamani

Release and reception 
The film released on 27 February 2015. This film was not profitable at the box office.

Critical reception 
Sangeetha Devi Dundoo of The Hindu wrote that "Give this a miss and re-visit Sanjay Leela Bhansali’s blockbuster of the same name instead. " The Times of India wrote that "Director Sripuram Kiran effectively drives home the point that marital bond is more important than an involvement with any person". A review in News 18 stated "Nanditha, who shined with her performance in films like Prema Katha Chitram, 'Lovers', fails to impress here."

References

External links
 

2015 films
Indian romantic comedy films
2015 romantic comedy films
2010s Telugu-language films
Films set in Malaysia
Films shot in Malaysia